K-Gruppen (Kommunistische Gruppen, "Communist Groups") is a term referring to various Marxist (often Maoist) organizations that sprang up in West Germany at the end of the 1960s, following the collapse of the Sozialistischer Deutscher Studentenbund (SDS).  They included the Communist Party of Germany/Marxists–Leninists (KPD/ML), the Kommunistische Partei Deutschlands (Aufbauorganisation) (KPD-AO), the Communist League (KB) and the Communist League of West Germany (KBW). In 1971 the Federal Office for the Protection of the Constitution estimated that Germany had around twenty active Maoist groups, with 800 members between them. A few of these groups went on to join the Green Party (now Alliance 90/The Greens) in the late 1970s, while others eventually formed the Marxist–Leninist Party of Germany (MLPD).

See also
Außerparlamentarische Opposition
West German student movement
New Communist Movement

References

External links
The historical development of West Germany’s new left from a politico-theoretical perspective with particular emphasis on the Marxistische Gruppe and Maoist K-Gruppen Phd thesis by Matthias Dapprich

Communism in Germany
Außerparlamentarische Opposition
History of West Germany